The Sidekicks were an American indie rock band from Cleveland, Ohio.

History
The Sidekicks released their first full-length album, So long, Soggy Dog in 2007. The following year, they released a 7" titled Sam. In 2009, The Sidekicks released their second full-length album titled Weight of Air. The Sidekicks released a split in 2011 with the band Tigers Jaw. In 2012, The Sidekicks released their third full-length album titled Awkward Breeds, as well as an EP titled Grace. The Sidekicks signed to Epitaph Records in 2014. The Sidekicks released their fourth full-length album in 2015 titled Runners In The Nerved World. The Sidekicks released their fifth full-length album in 2018 titled Happiness Hours.

The band disbanded in December 2022.

Band members
Steve Ciolek (Vocals & Guitar)
Toby Reif (Guitar & Vocals)
Ryan Starinsky (Bass & Vocals)
Matt Climer (Drums)

References

Musical groups from Cleveland
Musical groups established in 2006
Musical groups disestablished in 2022
2006 establishments in Ohio
2022 disestablishments in Ohio